Kevin Lynch (24 June 1927 – 31 October 2013) was an Irish judge and barrister who served as a Judge of the Supreme Court from 1996 to 1999 and a Judge of the High Court from 1984 to 1996. In 1984, he was the sole member of the Kerry Babies tribunal.

Early life and career
Lynch was born in Dublin in 1927. His father, Fionán Lynch, was a member of the First Dáil and a judge of the Circuit Court.

He attended St. Mary's College, Dublin and received a degree from University College Dublin. He attended the King's Inns where he won the John Brooke Scholarship.

He was called to the bar in 1949, and became a senior counsel in 1970. His practice was centred on the Midland circuit.

Judicial career

High Court
Lynch became a judge of the High Court in 1984. In December 1984, he was appointed the chair of the tribunal into the Kerry Babies case. He was among three judges who sat in a divisional High Court which heard an unsuccessful challenge by Des Hanafin to result of the 1995 divorce referendum. He heard the High Court hearing of Bula Ltd v Tara Mines Ltd (No 6) in 1996 which ran for 277 days.

Supreme Court
Lynch was appointed to the Supreme Court of Ireland in April 1996. He was delayed from first sitting on the court as the Bula case had not yet completed.

He retired in December 1999.

Personal life
He was married to Bernadette, with who he had five children. He died at the age of 85 in a nursing home near Croom, County Limerick in 2013.

References

1928 births
2013 deaths
People from County Dublin
Irish barristers
Alumni of University College Dublin
Alumni of King's Inns
High Court judges (Ireland)
Judges of the Supreme Court of Ireland
20th-century Irish judges
20th-century Irish lawyers